Placobdelloides  is a genus of glossophoniid leeches.

Description
Species of Placobdelloides lack a jaw and usually feed with a protrusible proboscis; they are predacious or sanguivorous, or both, on a variety of prey such as shrimps, waterfowl, fish, amphibians, turtles, crocodiles or mammals.

Species
The genus includes 17 species found worldwide: 

 Placobdelloides bancrofti (Best, 1931)
 Placobdelloides bdellae (Ingram, 1957)
 Placobdelloides emydae (Harding, 1924)
 Placobdelloides fimbriata (Johansson, 1909)
 Placobdelloides fulva (Harding, 1921)
 Placobdelloides horai (Baugh, 1960)
 Placobdelloides indica (Baugh, 1960)
 Placobdelloides jaegerskioeldi (Johansson, 1909)
 Placobdelloides maorica (Benham, 1907)
 Placobdelloides multistriata (Johansson, 1909)
 Placobdelloides octostriata (Grube, 1866)
 Placobdelloides okadai (Oka, 1925)
 Placobdelloides okai (Soós, 1969)
 Placobdelloides siamensis (Oka, 1917)
 Placobdelloides sirikanchanae Trivalairat, Chiangkul & Purivirojkul, 2019
 Placobdelloides stellapapillosa Goverdich et al., 2002
 Placobdelloides undulata (Harding, 1924)

References

Leeches
Annelid genera